Arlette is a given name. Notable people with the name include:
Arlette or Herleva, the mother of William the Conqueror
Arlette Alcock (born 1958), Métis-Canadian folk musician
Marie-Arlette Carlotti (born 1952), French politician and Member of the European Parliament for the south-east of France
Arlette Chabot (born 1951), prominent French journalist and political commentator
Arlette Cousture, OC (born 1948), Canadian writer
Arlette Franco (born 1939), member of the National Assembly of France
Arlette Grosskost (born 1953), member of the National Assembly of France
Arlette Laguiller (born 1940), French Trotskyist politician
Arlette Langmann, French screenwriter, film editor and production designer
Arlette Lefebvre, CM, O.Ont (born 1947), child psychiatrist at the Hospital for Sick Children in Toronto, Canada
Arlette Marchal (1902–1984), French film actress
Arlette Sterckx (1964), Belgian Television actress
Arlette Zola, singer who represented Switzerland in the Eurovision Song Contest 1982

Other uses
Arlette (musical), 1917 operetta with songs by Ivor Novello
Arlette (1997 film), a 1997 French film
Arlette (2022 film), a 2022 Canadian film
Arlette, a French cinnamon-flavoured palmier biscuit (a crunchy croissant cookie).

French feminine given names